Within Thelema, the Great Work is generally defined as those spiritual practices leading to the accomplishment of the True Will of one's Self in mystical union with the All. Its founder, author and occultist Aleister Crowley, based this path of mystical attainment or enlightenment on his studies in Hermetic alchemy and the Hermetic Qabalah, particularly as they were expounded by Eliphas Levi in the 19th century and later by various members in the Hermetic Order of the Golden Dawn, an occult society of which Crowley had been a member.

Crowley wrote that in 1904 he heard and transcribed, from an entity called Aiwass, a book which came to be titled The Book of the Law. Crowley made this book the central sacred text of his new religious movement called Thelema, which he believed heralded a new Aeon for mankind. Between 1907 and 1911, Crowley wrote a series of other small texts which he considered to be inspired, written through him rather than by him, which he afterwards collected together in an anthology now called The Holy Books of Thelema. These texts formed the mystical backbone of Crowley's system, on which he elaborated in his extensive writings on magick, mysticism, and occult subjects.

True Will and Union 

Thelema is a path intended to do two interrelated things: to enable one to learn one's 'True Will'; and to achieve union with 'the All'. This unification of opposites, the individual and the universal, is reiterated by Crowley in his book Magick Without Tears:

The techniques for accomplishing these goals Crowley referred to as 'Magick,' a word he used to describe Western ceremonial magic (especially invocations and eucharistic ceremonies) supported by Buddhist meditation, Hermetic Qabalah, English Qaballa, tarot, and yoga, all set in the context of the worship of Nuit, the goddess of "Infinite Stars and Infinite Space".

Within the system of the magical Order A∴A∴, the Great Work of the Probationer Grade is considered to be the pursuit of self-knowledge to, as Crowley said in The Confessions of Aleister Crowley, "obtain the knowledge of the nature and powers of my own being." However, Crowley continues, the Great Work should also be something that is integrated into the daily life of all. Although Crowley often discussed the idea of "succeeding" or "accomplishing" in the Great Work, he also recognized that the process is ongoing.

The ability to accomplish the Great Work requires a great deal of preparation and effort, according to Crowley's system. The programme consists of several key elements, including a thorough knowledge of the Hermetic Qabalah (especially the Tree of Life), disciplined concentration (i.e. meditation), the development of one's body of light  (in order to experience other planes) and the consistent and regular invocation of certain deities or spiritual beings ('assumption of godforms').

Within the mystical and philosophical system developed by Crowley, the core task for a practitioner is the discovery and manifestation of True Will. The realisation of this True Will is itself the Great Work, as expressed in the Benediction at the end of Crowley's Gnostic Mass, where the Priest blesses the congregation with the words:

Methods

Tree of Life 
The Tree of Life is a tool used to categorize and organize various mystical concepts. At its most simple level it is composed of ten spheres, or emanations, called sephiroth (sing. "sephira") which are connected by twenty-two paths. The sephiroth are represented by the planets and the paths by the characters of the Hebrew alphabet, which are subdivided by the five elements, the seven classical planets, and the twelve signs of the Zodiac.

Within the Western magical tradition, the Tree is used as a kind of conceptual filing cabinet. Each sephira and path is assigned various ideas, such as gods, cards of the Tarot, astrological planets and signs, elements, and so forth. Crowley's Liber 777 is one of the most comprehensive collections of such qabalistic correspondences. Other authors have written on the topic, including Eliphas Levi, Israel Regardie, and Gareth Knight.

The path of attainment is largely defined by the Tree of Life. The aspirant begins in Malkuth, which is the everyday material world of phenomena, with the ultimate goal being at Kether, the sphere of Unity with the All. Through various exercises and practices, the aspirant attains certain spiritual and mental states that are characterized by the various sephiroth that ascend the Tree. Crowley considered a deep understanding of the Qabalah to be essential to the Thelemite. The practice of the Middle Pillar is especially important.

Qabalah is key to understanding Thelemic texts and scriptures, many of which, including The Book of the Law, are written in abstract, poetic, and often cryptic language. Through the use of the Qabalah, and especially the function of gematria (a form of numerology), the normally opaque meaning of the texts can be made clear. Thelemites can also make use of gematria to link words and concepts and to validate revelations given to them in magical operations, such as astral travel.

Concentration 
Another key element to Thelemic mysticism is the ability to concentrate. This skill has two modalities: the first is the rapid, accurate, and efficient movement of thought (which is the realm of magick) and the other is the stopping of thought altogether (which is accomplished in Yoga). In the first, it is the manipulation of all ideas into one idea, and in the second is the taking of that one thought and reducing it to nothing.

Concentration is essentially the prerequisite for all sustained success, not only in spiritual practices, but in day-to-day life as well. The general program for developing concentration is borrowed almost completely from the practice of Yoga within the Hindu and Buddhist systems. Crowley gives a general overview of the techniques in two books: Eight Lectures on Yoga and in the section called "Mysticism" in Magick (Book 4).

Body of light 

Crowley referred to the 'augoeides', a Greek term for the body of light, and connected it with 'the Knowledge & Conversation of the Holy Guardian Angel' associated with each human being. He stressed that the body of light must be built up though the use of imagination, and that it must then be animated, exercised, and disciplined. According to Asprem (2017):

Crowley explains that the most important practices for developing the Body of Light are:

According to Crowley, the role of the body of light is broader than simply being a vehicle for astral travel — he writes that it is also the storehouse of all experience.

The benefit of astral travel is essentially one of education: it is akin to exploring one's own spiritual universe and understanding its fundamental components so that the one can eventually master it. The general object is the "control of the Astral Plane, the ability to find one's way about it, to penetrate such sanctuaries as are guarded from the profane, [and] to make such relations with its inhabitants as may avail to acquire knowledge and power, or to command service". Also, "one's apprehension of the Astral Plane must be accurate, for Angels, Archangels, and Gods are derived therefrom by analysis. One must have pure materials if one wishes to brew pure beer".

Crowley believed that what was experienced during "astral travel" was not relevant in terms of what is "real" or "unreal". He thought that the only value to this practice is in the utility it provides to the practitioner. He believed that the body of light is more important than simply for astral travel—that it is also the storehouse of all experiences.

Magick 

According to Crowley, there is a single definition of the purpose for ritual magick: to achieve Union with God through "the uniting of the Microcosm with the Macrocosm". Since this process is so arduous, it is also acceptable to use magick to develop the self (i.e. one's body of light) or to create ideal circumstances for the Work (e.g. having access to a place in which to do ritual undisturbed). There are many kinds of magick, but the categories of ritual that are recommended by Crowley include banishing unwanted forces, various forms of invocation, and the eucharist, which "consists in taking common things, transmuting them into things divine, and consuming them".

Milestones

Crowley often wrote that every practitioners's path will be unique. He also wrote that two major milestones are fundamental to Thelemic mysticism, which he called the knowledge of and conversation with one's Holy Guardian Angel and the crossing of the Abyss. Crowley wrote, "the two crises—the Angel and the Abyss—are necessary features in every career. The other tasks are not always accomplished in [any given order]".

Holy Guardian Angel 

Even though the Holy Guardian Angel (or HGA) is, in a sense, the “higher self”, it is often experienced as a separate being, independent from the experiencer. In the system of the A∴A∴ magical order, the single most important goal is to consciously connect with one's HGA, a process termed “Knowledge and Conversation.” By doing so, a magician becomes fully aware of their own True Will. For Crowley, this event was the single most important goal of any practitioner of magick.

In most of his writings, Crowley described the Holy Guardian Angel as one's "Silent Self", at times equitable with one's deepest unconscious. In later writings, he insisted that the HGA is an entirely separate and objective being. Whichever position is taken, the object remains the same—to gain an intimate spiritual connection so that one's True Will can become fully known and manifested. When using the Tree of Life as a guide, this event occurs in the Sphere of Tiphareth.

Crowley wrote Liber Samekh as an example of a ritual designed specifically for attaining the Knowledge and Conversation with one's HGA. In his notes to this ritual, Crowley sums up the key to success: “INVOKE OFTEN.” Another detailed description of the general operation is given in The Vision and the Voice, Aethyr 8.

Crossing the Abyss 

After one attains Knowledge and Conversation with the Holy Guardian Angel, a practitioner may choose to then reach the next major milestone: the crossing of the Abyss, the great gulf or void between the phenomenal world of manifestation and its noumenal source, that great spiritual wilderness which must be crossed by the practitioner to attain mastery.

According to Crowley, Choronzon is the Dweller in the Abyss; he is there as the final obstruction. If he is met with the proper preparation, then he is there to destroy the ego, which allows the practitioner to move beyond the Abyss. If unprepared, then the unfortunate traveller will be utterly dispersed into annihilation. Both Choronzon and the Abyss are discussed in Crowley's Confessions (ch. 66).

However, just on the other side of the Abyss awaits Babalon (in the sphere of Binah on the Tree of Life). She calls the practitioner to surrender completely, so that they may cross over.

City of the Pyramids and the Night of Pan 

If a practitioner gives themselves to Babalon, as symbolised by the pouring of the practitioners' blood into Babalon's graal, they become impregnated in her, becoming a "Babe of the Abyss" who is then reborn as a Master and a Saint that dwells in the City of the Pyramids.

The City of the Pyramids is the home to those practitioners that have crossed the great Abyss, having spilled all their blood in the Graal of Babalon. They have destroyed their earthly ego-identities, becoming nothing more than piles of dust (i.e. the remaining aspects of their True Selves without the self-sense of "I"). Within, they take on the name or title of Saint or Nemo (Latin for No-Man or No-One). In the system of A∴A∴ they are called Masters of the Temple. It is a step along the path of spiritual purification, and a spiritual resting place for those who have successfully shed their attachments to the mundane world.

The City exists under the Night of Pan, or N.O.X. The playful and lecherous Pan is the Greek god of nature, lust, and the masculine generative power. The Greek word Pan also translates as All, and so he is “a symbol of the Universal, a personification of Nature; both Pangenetor, "all-begetter," and Panphage, "all-devourer". Pan is both the giver and the taker of life, and his Night is that time of symbolic death where the practitioner experiences unification with the All through the ecstatic destruction of the ego-self. In a less poetic symbolic sense, this is the state where one transcends all limitations and experiences oneness with the universe.

See also 
Astrotheology
Magical formula

Notes

References

Citations

Works cited

Primary sources

Secondary sources

Other sources 

 Thelemapedia. (2006). Thelemic mysticism. Retrieved April 21, 2006.

Further reading

 

 

Thelema